Aporé is a municipality in southwest Goiás state, Brazil.  The municipality is a large producer of cattle.  Aporé belongs to the Southwest Goiás Microregion.

Geography
Aporé is 445 quilômetros from the state capital, Goiânia, near the boundary with the state of Mato Grosso do Sul.  It is linked by highways BR-060 / Guapó / Indiara / Rio Verde / GO-174 / GO-422 / GO-206 / Caçu / GO-178 / Itajá / GO-302. (Source: Sepin) It is part of the Sudoeste de Goiás Microregion.  Municipal boundaries are with Serranópolis, State of Mato Grosso do Sul, Itajá, and Chapadão do Céu.

The climate is tropical humid, with average temperatures between 20 °C and 30 °C.  The average elevation is 500 meters above sea level.  Important rivers are the Aporé, which forms the boundary between the states of Goiás and Mato Grosso do Sul, the Corrente, the Peixe and the Prata.

Districts, Villages, and Hamlets
Villages:  Itumirim

Demographics
Population density in 2007: 1.23 inhabitants/km2
Population growth rate 1996/2007: 0.41.%
Total population in 2007: 3,554
Total population in 1980: 2,764
Urban population in 2007: 2,291
Rural population in 2007: 1,263

The economy
The main economic activity is cattle raising (210,000 head) and agriculture.  The main crops in 2006 were corn and soybeans.
Industrial units: 5
Retail units: 43
Financial institutions: Banco do Brasil S.A. (August/2007)
Dairies: Laticínios Aporé Indústria e Comércio Ltda. (22/05/2006)
GDP in 2005 (R$1,000.00):  43,314
GDP per capita in 2005 (R$1.00):  12,376

Motor vehicles
Automobiles: 281
Pickup trucks: 77
Number of inhabitants per motor vehicle: 10

Main agricultural products in ha.(2006)
corn:      400
soybeans: 2,000

Farm Data (2006)in ha.
Number of farms:                311
Total area:                  322,905
Area of permanent crops:        322
Area of perennial crops:     17,835
Area of natural pasture:     214,147
Persons dependent on farming: 713

Health and education
The infant mortality rate was (for every 1,000 born alive): 2000—23.82
(IBGE 2002) while the literacy rate was 2000—85.4%
(IBGE 2002)
In 2006 there were 4 schools with 949 students.  There was 1 hospital with 23 beds.

The Municipal Human Development Index was 0.752, ranking Aporé 72 out of 242 municipalities in the state and 1,827 out of 5,507 municipalities in the country.

History
The history of Aporé begins in the twentieth century near a site where a village, Arraial do Corrente, already existed.  With the decadence of this settlement rancher João Nunes founded a settlement nearby on the banks of the Aporé River.  Lands were donated to erect a chapel to the Divino Espírito Santo and a bridge was built over the river, allowing communications with Mato Grosso.  In 1938 the first houses appeared and the village was named Aporé after the river, a name which means "river of fish".  In 1958 Aporé became a municipality.

See also
List of municipalities in Goiás
Microregions of Goiás

References

 Frigoletto

Municipalities in Goiás